Padmavati, identified with modern Pawaya in Madhya Pradesh, was an ancient Indian city mentioned in several classic Sanskrit texts,  Malatimadhavam  of Bhavabhuti, Harshacharita of Bana, and Sarasvatīkaṇṭhabharaṇa of Raja Bhoja. Bhavabhuti describes the city with tall mansions and temples with shikharas and gates, located between Para and the Sindhu rivers.

It is also mentioned in inscriptions like the Kokkala Grahapati inscription of Khajuraho. The inscription mentions that the city had rows of tall mansions. The dust used to arise because of running of strong horses.

Identification
Alexander Cunningham identified Padmavati with present Narwar near Gwalior. M B Garde carried out excavations at Pawaya in 1924-25, 1933–34 and 1941. He identifies Pawaya with ancient Padmavati rejecting Cunningham’s identification with Narwar. Coins of several  Naga kings, who have been dated between 210-340 AD, have been found at Pawaya.

Antiquities
Among the antiquities found at Pawaya is an image of Yaksha Manibhadra. It has an inscription that mentions that it was installed in the fourth regnal year of King Sivanandi and was worshipped by the gosthas or merchants.

See also
 Pawāyā Gupta image inscription
 Narwar coinage
 Grahapati Kokkala inscription

References

External sources
 Pawaya – Glamour of the Ancient Padmavati, http://puratattva.in/2011/07/11/pawaya-glamour-of-the-ancient-padmavati-159.html

Monuments and memorials in Madhya Pradesh
Shivpuri district